Fábio Gonçalves Abreu (born 29 January 1993) is a professional footballer who plays for Emirati club Khor Fakkan and the Angolan national team as a striker.

Club career
Born in Lisbon of Angolan descent, Abreu moved to Manchester in England as a child, where he attended Loreto College. He played youth football for Bacup Borough and Mossley, and trialled with S.L. Benfica before signing a three-year contract with C.S. Marítimo in July 2011. In 2012, he was loaned to amateurs Clube Desportivo Ribeira Brava – also in the island of Madeira – to kickstart his senior career.

Abreu spent the better part of his spell at the Estádio do Marítimo registered with the reserve side. His first Primeira Liga appearance with the first team occurred on 1 February 2015, when he came on as a late substitute in a 1−1 away draw against Académica de Coimbra; in May 2014, he renewed his contract until June 2017.

On 10 July 2017, Abreu signed a two-year deal with LigaPro team F.C. Penafiel as a free agent. With 12 goals in his first season, he ranked seventh in the league's goalscorers, including a hat-trick on 21 October in a 4–1 home victory over Sporting CP B.

In June 2019, Abreu returned to the top division when he joined Moreirense F.C. for three years; he released himself from an agreement with Gil Vicente F.C. in order to do so. On 11 August, at home to precisely that team, he scored his first top-flight goal to open a 3–0 win, and from February to March 2020 he netted in six consecutive games, ending with one in a 2–0 defeat of former club Marítimo. He finished the campaign as an ever-present with 13 goals, the fifth-most in the league.

On 13 October 2020, Abreu signed for Saudi Professional League club Al Batin FC in a €2.5 million transfer, under Portuguese manager José Garrido. He scored on his debut 16 days later, equalising in a 2–1 home win over Al Raed FC.

Abreu moved to the UAE Pro League with Khor Fakkan Club in July 2022.

International career
Abreu played three games for England Schoolboys in 2010. He won his first cap for Angola on 6 September 2019, featuring the entire 1−0 away win over Gambia for the 2022 FIFA World Cup qualifiers, and scored his first goal in the return leg, a 2−1 victory in Luanda that qualified the team to the group phase.

International goals
 (Angola score listed first, score column indicates score after each Abreu goal)

References

External links

1993 births
Living people
Angolan emigrants to the United Kingdom
Portuguese emigrants to England
Portuguese sportspeople of Angolan descent
Angolan footballers
Portuguese footballers
Footballers from Lisbon
Association football forwards
Bacup Borough F.C. players
Mossley A.F.C. players
Primeira Liga players
Liga Portugal 2 players
Segunda Divisão players
C.S. Marítimo players
F.C. Penafiel players
Moreirense F.C. players
Saudi Professional League players
Al Batin FC players
UAE Pro League players
Khor Fakkan Sports Club players
Angola international footballers
Angolan expatriate footballers
Portuguese expatriate footballers
Expatriate footballers in England
Expatriate footballers in Portugal
Expatriate footballers in Saudi Arabia
Expatriate footballers in the United Arab Emirates
Angolan expatriate sportspeople in Portugal
Angolan expatriate sportspeople in Saudi Arabia
Angolan expatriate sportspeople in the United Arab Emirates
Portuguese expatriate sportspeople in England
Portuguese expatriate sportspeople in Saudi Arabia
Portuguese expatriate sportspeople in the United Arab Emirates